The Mint of Poland is a private company (Mennica Polska S.A.) which is the only body permitted to manufacture (mint) coins and investment products in Poland. It is located in Warsaw. It is a joint-stock company, with a listing on the Warsaw Stock Exchange since April 7, 1998, which makes it the only mint in the world that is publicly traded.

History 

On 10 February 1766, the mint reform was effected in Poland, the new mint organized in Warsaw at Bielanska Street coined the gold, silver and copper pieces, as well as the medals and orders.

References

External links

 Mint of Poland

Companies listed on the Warsaw Stock Exchange
Mints (currency)
Economy of Poland